The Keelung City Council or Keelung Municipal Council (KMC) is the elected city council of Keelung City, Republic of China. The council composes of 32 councilors lastly elected through the 2022 Republic of China local election on 26 November 2022.

Organization
 Review Committees
 Civil Administration
 Finance
 Construction
 Education
 Procedure Committee
 Discipline Committee

Transportation
The council is accessible within walking distance East of Keelung Station of Taiwan Railways.

See also
 Keelung City Government

References

External links

  

City councils in Taiwan
Keelung